The following list includes all of the Canadian Register of Historic Places listings in: 
Bulkley-Nechako Regional District,
Cariboo Regional District,
Fraser-Fort George Regional District,
Peace River Country, and
Stikine Country.

References 

(references appear in the table above as external links)

British Columbia Interior north